is the second full-length album by J-pop group Berryz Kobo, released on November 16, 2005. "Dai 2"  (the second) is pronounced Dai ni. The first pressing of the album was enclosed in a cardboard slipcase and included four double-sided photocards of the band. The album peaked at #19 on the Oricon weekly charts, charting for 3 weeks.

This album was the last Berryz Kobo release to feature Maiha Ishimura, who graduated from Hello! Project in 2005 in order to focus on her education. Ishimura's vocals are featured on the singles within the album; she is, however, not credited anywhere and does not feature on the cover. The seven remaining members of the band are depicted in school uniforms and carrying bookbags.

Dai 2 Seichōki would be the first of an informal trilogy of three Berryz releases, each issued within one or two weeks of each other, to close out the group's second year of existence.

Track listing
 
 
 
 
 Koi no Jubaku (恋の呪縛 Love's Curse)
 
 "Happiness (Kōfuku Kangei!)"

Personnel

Saki Shimizu - vocals
Momoko Tsugunaga - vocals
Chinami Tokunaga - vocals
Miyabi Natsuyaki - vocals
Maasa Sudou - vocals
Yurina Kumai - vocals
Risako Sugaya - vocals
Maiha Ishimura - vocals (uncredited)
Koichi Yuasa - keyboard, drum and MIDI programming
Koji Makaino - keyboards, drum and MIDI programming
Shunsuke Suzuki - guitar, keyboards, drum and MIDI programming
Hideyuki Komatsu - bass
Horishi Iida - percussion
Masato Yamao - organ
Shoichiro Hirata - keyboards, drum and MIDI programming
Nao Tanaka - keyboards, drum and MIDI programming, guitar
Manao Doi - guitar
Shunji Takenaka - guitar
Takashi Morio - keyboards, drum and MIDI programming
Eiji Kawai - guitar
Koji - guitar
Takao Konishi - keyboards, drum and MIDI programming
Yasuo Asai - guitar
Yasushi Sasamoto - bass
Masanori Suzuki - trumpet
Yoshinari Takegami - saxophone
Satoshi Mizota - trombone
Noriyoshi Matsushita - keyboards, drum and MIDI programming
Tsunku - backing vocals, composer
Atsuko Inaba - backing vocals
Hiroaki Takeuchi - backing vocals
Amazons (Yuko Otaki, Kumi Saito, Tomoko Hada) - backing vocals

Production

Nobuyasu Umemoto - recording coordination
Kazumi Matsui - recording engineer, mix engineer
Ryo Wakizawa - recording engineer, mix engineer
Shinnosuke Kobayashi - recording engineer
Takeshi Yanagisawa - mix engineer
Yuji Yamashita - mix engineer
Tsunku - mix engineer
Yuichi Ohtsubo - 2nd engineer
Hirofumi Hiraki - 2nd engineer
Yōhei Horiuchi - 2nd engineer
Mitsuko Koike - mastering engineer

Charts

References

External links
Discography entry on the Up-Front Works site

Berryz Kobo albums
Piccolo Town-King Records albums
2005 albums